Lohmann & Rauscher (L&R) is a leading international developer, producer, and seller of forward-looking medical devices and hygiene products. The international company group grew out of the merger between the German company Lohmann (founded in 1851) and the Austrian company Rauscher (founded in 1899), which took place in 1998.
L&R currently has over 5,500 employees worldwide. In 2020, the corporate group is represented by 50 subsidiaries and shareholdings in 27 countries, and by more than 130 partner companies. The company headquarters are located in Rengsdorf (Germany)  and Vienna (Austria). The Group sales reached more than 7500 million euros in 2019.

The L&R product range contains more than 16,000 products from the areas of medicine, nursing and hygiene – they include dressing materials, bandages (e.g. under the Rosidal brand), supports and orthoses (e.g. the Cellacare, Velpeau, epX brands), plaster room products (e.g. under the Cellona brand) wound dressings for all phases of wound healing (the Suprasorb family of brands), OR set systems and hygiene (e.g. the Raucodrape, Kitpack, Setpack, Sentinex brands), as well as consumer articles (e.g. the brands Bellawa cotton wool products and Senta feminine hygiene products). The company recently expanded its spectrum of services for hospitals with the L&R Optiline service concept. In the area of medical technology, L&R introduced the Suprasorb CNP range for negative pressure therapy in 2008.

In addition to hospitals, doctors, nurses and pharmacies, L&R's customers also include medical supplies retailers, wholesalers and industry, and retail businesses for consumer products.

Gallery

External links 
 Website

References 

Companies based in Rhineland-Palatinate
Medical technology companies of Austria
German brands
Medical technology companies of Germany
Medical and health organisations based in Rhineland-Palatinate